The Institute of International Education Scholar Rescue Fund (IIE-SRF) provides fellowships for established scholars whose lives and work are threatened in their home countries. These fellowships permit professors, researchers and other senior academics to find temporary refuge at host universities and colleges anywhere in the world, enabling them to pursue their academic work. In some cases, conditions may improve, but if the scholar is unable to return home, the scholar may use the fellowship period to identify a longer-term opportunity.

History
The Institute of International Education has helped rescue threatened scholars since its inception in 1919, demonstrating a commitment to protecting academic freedom. In the 1930s, IIE was instrumental in founding the Emergency Committee in Aid of Displaced Foreign Scholars, led by Edward R. Murrow. The program assisted scholars who were barred from teaching, persecuted and threatened with imprisonment by the Nazis. Over 300 scholars were rescued, some of whom became Nobel Laureates and many whose work and ideas helped shape the post-war world. It is the only organization that professors throughout the world can turn to for assistance.

Other major activities undertaken throughout the Institute's history, before the formal establishment of IIE-SRF in 2002, include: The Russian Student Fund (1920-1949), Rescue of Scholars from Fascist Italy (1922-1924), Rescue of Scholars from the Spanish Civil War (1936-1939), Committee on Awards for Chinese Students (1942-1945), Emergency Program to Aid Hungarian University Students (in cooperation with World University Service) (1956-1958), The South African Education Program (1979-2001), Rescue of Burmese Refugees (1990-1992), Asia-Help (1998-2000), and Balkan-Help (1999-2000).

Scholar Rescue Fund launch
IIE-SRF was founded and endowed in 2002, when IIE's trustees committed to making scholar rescue a permanent part of its work. As of 2016, IIE-SRF has provided over 1,290 awards with the collaboration of over 650 institutions from over 55 different countries. The IIE-SRF Fellowships have no geographic limits on awards, on the disciplines, or fields supported. Fellowships may be awarded to scholars from any country and/or institutions. As of 2017, IIE-SRF has hosted more than 750 scholars from the Middle East and North Africa (70.6%), Sub-Saharan Africa (11.1%), Europe and Eurasia (9.0%), Central, East, and South Asia (7.7%), and Latin American and the Caribbean (1.3%).  

In 2006, when security concerns in Iraq reached unprecedented levels, the Fund responded by launching the Iraq Project. From 2007 to 2014, the Iraq Project provided support to Iraqi university professors and scientists to resume their teaching and research in safety. The Project's goal was to rescue more than 200 of Iraq's most senior academics – in any academic discipline – by placing them temporarily at institutions of higher learning in countries within the Middle East and North Africa region. By the Project's completion in September 2014, over 280 Iraqi scholars had received fellowships to help them resume their teaching and research activities in safety.

The Iraq Project continues today through the Iraq Distance Learning Initiative, which includes the Iraq Scholar Lecture Series and the IIE-SRF University Joint Courses Project.

Artist Protection Fund and IIE-SRF Alliance
To further support SRF's work, the Artist Protection Fund was established in May 2015, and the IIE-SRF Alliance launched in August 2020 to assist with the large-scale displacement of scholars worldwide that occurred in part due to the Covid-19 crisis.

References

External links 
 Scholar Rescue Fund Official Website
 Scholar Rescue Fund: Iraq Scholar Rescue Project
 Institute of International Education Official Website

Human rights organizations based in the United States
Academic freedom